is a Japanese bureaucrat. He served as Grand Steward of the Imperial Household Agency from 1 April 2005 to 1 June 2012.

He criticized Prince Tomohito of Mikasa for his comment that agnatic primogeniture should be kept, and requested the members of the Imperial House to refrain from expressing their opinion on the succession. Right after the birth of Prince Hisahito of Akishino, he commented that the newborn prince would not solve the succession crisis, and insisted that the law be changed. In November 2011, he held a meeting with Prime Minister Yoshihiko Noda to discuss the possibility for allowing women to head branches of the Imperial House (rather than to lose imperial status upon marriage), in order to replenish the number of imperial members who can help fulfill the court-related duties

He had worked at the Ministry of Health until he was installed as Vice-Grand Steward of the Imperial Household Agency in 2001. Haketa announced his retirement effective 1 June 2012, and was replaced by Noriyuki Kazaoka.

See also 
 Japanese succession controversy

References 

 Sankei Shimbun, 1 April 2005.
 Yomiuri Shimbun Morning News, 11 November 2005.
 Yomiuri Shimbun Morning News, 13 September 2006.

Government ministers of Japan
People from Yamaguchi Prefecture
1942 births
Living people
Kyoto University alumni